In My Mother's Skin is a 2023 Filipino horror film written and directed by Kenneth Dagatan. It stars Beauty Gonzalez, Felicity Kyle Napuli, James Mavie Estrella, Angeli Bayani, Ronnie Lazaro, Arnold Reyes, Noel Sto. Domingo and Jasmine Curtis-Smith. Set during World War II, the film's plot follows a young girl who, while tending to her dying mother, becomes acquainted with a flesh-eating fairy.

Premise
As World War II in 1945 Philippines is coming to an end, a wealthy family is trapped in their country mansion and terrorized by Japanese soldiers who are losing control of the island. The family's patriarch, Aldo, is rumored to have stolen Japanese gold and hidden it nearby. Knowing that his family will be killed if the gold is found, Aldo leaves to seek help from the Americans. His absence causes the family to fear that he will never return, while the mother's health deteriorates. Desperate for help, the family's young daughter Tala turns to a deceitful and flesh-eating fairy, who plans to devour them all.

Cast
 Beauty Gonzalez as Ligaya
 Felicity Kyle Napuli as Tala
 Jasmine Curtis-Smith as Fairy
 James Mavie Estrella
 Angeli Bayani as Amor

Release
An international co-production of the Philippines, Singapore and Taiwan, In My Mother's Skin premiered at the 2023 Sundance Film Festival, as part of the festival's "Midnight" section on January 21, 2023. It is the only non-English-language film in the section. Amazon Studios acquired the global rights to the film, marking its first acquisition of the festival, and will make it available to stream worldwide on Prime Video.

Reception 
On review aggregator website Rotten Tomatoes, the film has an approval rating of 89% based on 27 reviews, with an average rating of 6.7/10.

References

External links
 

2023 horror films
2023 films
2023 fantasy films
2023 independent films
Philippine horror films
Philippine fantasy films
Singaporean horror films
Singaporean fantasy films
Taiwanese horror films
Taiwanese fantasy films
World War II films
Films about fairies and sprites
Tagalog-language films